Jonas Arthur Engberg (1 January 1888 – 27 March 1944), was a Swedish social democratic politician. He was a Member of the Riksdag 1917–1940, as well as minister of education and ecclesiastical affairs from September 1932 to June 1936, and from the autumn of 1936 until 1939.

20th-century Swedish politicians
1888 births
1944 deaths
Uppsala University alumni
Antisemitism in Sweden
Swedish Ministers for Education
Members of the Riksdag
Swedish Ministers of Education and Ecclesiastical Affairs